Beyond the Prairie: The True Story of Laura Ingalls Wilder and its sequel Beyond the Prairie, Part 2: The True Story of Laura Ingalls Wilder, are television films shown in two parts, the first in 2000 and the second in 2002, which presented episodes from the later books in the Little House on the Prairie series (from The Long Winter to The First Four Years).

Cast
 Richard Thomas as Charles Ingalls
 Lindsay Crouse as Caroline Ingalls
 Meredith Monroe as Laura Ingalls
 Barbara Jane Reams as Mary Ingalls
 Haley McCormick as Carrie Ingalls
 Walton Goggins as Almanzo Wilder
 Skye McCole Bartusiak as Rose Wilder
 Tess Harper as Older Laura Ingalls Wilder/Narrator
 Cody Linley as Charlie Magnuson

Awards
2000 Emmy Nomination, Outstanding Music Composition for a Miniseries, Movie or a Special (Ernest Troost)

External links

Little House series
Television shows set in Minnesota
CBS network films